The 2022 MLS Next All-Star Game (known as the 2022 MLS Next All-Star Game presented by Allstate for sponsorship reasons) is the first edition of the MLS Next All-Star Game under its current format and the seventh edition of the game including the MLS Homegrown Game matches. The game will be played between the East and West All-Stars at the National Sports Center in Blaine, Minnesota as part of MLS All-Star Week, specifically leading up to the 2022 MLS All-Star Game.

This is the first homegrown All-Star game in MLS since 2019 due to the COVID-19 pandemic.

Venue 
Corresponding with the MLS All-Star Game being held at Allianz Field in St. Paul, Minnesota, the MLS Next All-Star Game will also be played in the Twin Cities.

Squads 
The rosters for the MLS Next All-Star Game was announced on June 27, 2022.

MLS Next East 

Coach:  Javier Morales (Inter Miami) and  Rob Becerra (New England Revolution)

MLS Next West 

Coaches:  Jeremy Hall (Minnesota United) and  Antonio Medina (San Francisco Glens)

Broadcasting 
The match will be streamed live on MLSSoccer.com and on Twitch.

Match

See also 
 2022 MLS All-Star Game

Notes

References 

All-Star Game
August 2022 sports events in the United States
2022 in sports in Minnesota